Newcastle West, an electoral district of the Legislative Assembly in the Australian state of New South Wales was created in 1894 and abolished in 1904.


Election results

Elections in the 1900s

1901

Elections in the 1890s

1898

1895

1894

References

New South Wales state electoral results by district